Gustavo Lozano (born 6 October 1951) is a Mexican former swimmer. He competed in three events at the 1976 Summer Olympics.

References

External links
 

1951 births
Living people
Mexican male swimmers
Olympic swimmers of Mexico
Swimmers at the 1976 Summer Olympics
Place of birth missing (living people)
Pan American Games bronze medalists for Mexico
Pan American Games medalists in swimming
Swimmers at the 1975 Pan American Games
Medalists at the 1975 Pan American Games